Two Weeks in September (French title: À coeur joie) is a 1967 British-French drama film directed by Serge Bourguignon and starring Brigitte Bardot, Laurent Terzieff, Jean Rochefort and James Robertson Justice.

Plot
Model Cecile spends two weeks away from her older lover Philippe and is tempted by a younger man.

Cast
Brigitte Bardot as Cécile
Laurent Terzieff as Vincent
Jean Rochefort as Philippe
James Robertson Justice as McClintock
Michael Sarne as Dickinson
Georgina Ward as Patricia
Carole Lebel as Monique
Annie Nicolas as Chantal
Murray Head as Dickinson's assistant

Production
The film was the sixth in a series of movies financed jointly by the Rank Organization and the NFFC. British companies provided 30% of the budget; French companies provided 70%. It was shot at the Billancourt Studios in Paris and on location around London. Scenes for the film were also shot on the beach at Gullane in East Lothian in September 1966. The principal cast stayed at the Open Arms in Dirleton.

Soundtrack

The soundtrack features two songs in English, "Do You Want to Marry Me?" and "I Must Tell You Why", with music by Michel Magne and vocals sung by David Gilmour, working as a session musician with his band Jokers Wild, before he joined Pink Floyd.

Reception
"Two hours wasted" said the Los Angeles Times.

The film received very poor reviews overall.

Box office
The film was a box office disappointment.

References

Notes

External links

Two Weeks in September at TCMDB

1960s French-language films
Films directed by Serge Bourguignon
French romantic drama films
British romantic drama films
1967 films
Films shot in Scotland
Films shot in East Lothian
Films set in London
Films shot in London
Films shot at Billancourt Studios
David Gilmour
1960s British films
1960s French films